Vogart Crafts Corporation, based in New York City, was best known for designing and manufacturing iron-on embroidery transfer designs.

History
It was a United States corporation in business from about 1930 until around 1990, when its parent corporation, Pioneer Systems, Inc., caused it to file for bankruptcy under Chapter 11.  

Eli J. Segal served as Vogart Crafts Corporation's CEO for a period of time, until his resignation in 1981.

References
"Vogart Transfer Patterns, Facts and Trivia."  Website of "The Sewing Palette": http://www.sewingpalette.com/supplies/vogartnotes.html
"Business Brief -- Pioneer Systems Inc.: Vogart Crafts Unit Files For Chapter 11 Protection," Wall Street Journal. (Eastern edition). New York, N.Y.: Oct 16, 1990. pg. C5.  (Accessed via ProQuest database, document ID 27753389.)
"Democratic Campaign Chief Eli Segal" (Obituary), by Adam Bernstein, Washington Post, February 21, 2006.  (Accessed via online database, https://www.washingtonpost.com/wp-dyn/content/article/2006/02/20/AR2006022001336.html)
"Fugitives from the Garden Patch," by Diane C Arkins. Antiques & Collecting Magazine. July 2008. Vol. 113, Iss. 5; pg. 20.  (Discussing popularity of Vogart pattern transfers as a collectible.)  (Accessed via Proquest database, document ID 1512434981.)

Sewing equipment
American companies established in 1930
Design companies established in 1930
Manufacturing companies established in 1930
Manufacturing companies disestablished in 1990
1930 establishments in New York City
1990 disestablishments in New York (state)
Defunct manufacturing companies based in New York City